The 1991–92 season saw Sampdoria compete in this season's editions of the Serie A, Coppa Italia, and European Cup. The club reached the 1992 European Cup Final only to suffer a 1–0 loss in extra time to Barcelona.

In the league, Sampdoria finished tied for sixth with Parma. Due to Sampdoria's failure to secure European football, championship-winning coach Vujadin Boškov left his job.

Squad

Transfers

Winter

Results

Supercoppa

Serie A

League table

Results by round

Matches

Coppa Italia

Second round

Eightfinals

Quarterfinals

Semifinals

European Cup

First round

Second round

Group stage

Final

Statistics

Players statistics

References

Sources
RSSSF - Italy 1991/92

U.C. Sampdoria seasons
Sampdoria